Events in the year 2008 in Turkey.

Incumbents
President: Abdullah Gül 
Prime Minister: Recep Tayyip Erdoğan
Speaker: Köksal Toptan

Deaths
4 January – Gündüz Tekin Onay
22 January – Orhan Aksoy
8 March – Sadun Aren
20 April – Gazanfer Bilge
10 May - Leyla Gencer
10 August – Cezmi Kartay

References

 
Years of the 21st century in Turkey
2000s in Turkey
Turkey
Turkey
Turkey